The Light Between Worlds is an EP by Eden, released on 1990 by Nightshift Records UK.

Track listing

Personnel
Adapted from The Light Between Worlds liner notes.

Eden
Pieter Bourke – percussion, keyboards
Sean Bowley – vocals, guitar, keyboards
Ross Healy – bass guitar

Production and additional personnel
 Antenna – photography, design
 Eden – production (A1, A2, B3), remixing (B1, B2)
 Chris Harold – production (B1, B2)
 Kevin Metcalfe – mastering
 Simon Polinski – production (A1, A2, B3), remixing (B1, B2)

Release history

References

External links 
 

1990 debut EPs
Eden (Australian band) albums